EP C/B EP is a two disc compilation by the American math rock band Battles. It brings together the two previous EPs, EP C, B EP and the "Tras" single. It was released in 2006 on Warp Records.

EP C was originally released on June 8, 2004 with Monitor Records, and B EP on September 14, 2004 with Dim Mak Records.

Track listing

The final track, "FANTASY", is divided into 10 tracks on the CD version. The first of these is 8:31, this is followed by 8 tracks of 4 second bass kicks. The final track (a quieter bass kick) is 6 seconds. Track lengths shown as they appear on the CD jacket. The actual lengths differ by seconds.

Personnel
 Dave Konopka – bass, guitar, effects
 John Stanier – drums
 Ian Williams – guitar, keyboards
 Tyondai Braxton – guitar, keyboards, vocals

References

Battles (band) compilation albums
2006 compilation albums